The important cities of North Korea have self-governing status equivalent to that of provinces.  Pyongyang, the largest city and capital, is classified as a chikhalsi (capital city), while three cities (see the list below) are classified as t'ŭkpyŏlsi (special city). Other cities are classified as si (city) and are under provincial jurisdiction, at the same level as counties (see Administrative divisions of North Korea).

List
Notes
 All population figures come from the 2008 North Korean census.
 Several former special cities have been re-merged with their provinces, including Chongjin, Hamhung and Kaesong.
 Rason was annexed into North Hamgyong Province in 2004, but was later promoted back to special city in 2010 to help manage it for foreign investment.
 Chosŏn'gŭl has replaced Hancha; Hancha has not been officially used in North Korea since the 1950s.

(Note: foundation dates are the dates the cities were legally founded as their current status by the North Korean government. They all existed as prior settlements before these dates.)

See also 

 Administrative divisions of North Korea
 Special cities of North Korea
 List of cities in South Korea
 Geography of North Korea

Further reading 
Dormels, Rainer. North Korea's Cities: Industrial facilities, internal structures and typification. Jimoondang, 2014. 

North Korea
Cities
North Korea